Kim Cameron may refer to:
 Kim S. Cameron, Professor of Management and Organizations
 Kim Cameron (computer scientist)
 Kimberly Keiko Cameron, main character of Skim